Seh Godar (also Romanized as Seh Godār; also known as Seh Godār-e Cham-e Āftāb) is a village in Poshteh-ye Zilayi Rural District, Sarfaryab District, Charam County, Kohgiluyeh and Boyer-Ahmad Province, Iran. At the 2006 census, its population was 143, in 24 families.

References 

Populated places in Charam County